Crossbow is a 1987 historical drama action adventure television series that aired on CBN Cable Network. The series was produced by Steven North and Richard Schlesinger for Robert Halmi Inc., in co-production with French television network FR3, and filmed entirely on location in France.

Crossbow follows the adventures of William Tell (Will Lyman) and takes place in the 14th-century in Switzerland. William Tell and his son Matthew are imprisoned by the tyrannical Gessler (Jeremy Clyde).  As Governor (Landburgher in the original story) of Austria, Gessler plans to stop the Swiss uprising.  Having split the apple on his son's head with his crossbow, much to Gessler's chagrin, there is no stopping William Tell's legendary strength and skill.

Characters

Main
 William Tell, played by Will Lyman
 Governor Hermann Gessler, played by Jeremy Clyde
 Blade, played by Melinda Mullins
 Roland, played by Valentine Pelka
 Matthew Tell, played by David Barry Gray
 Katrina Tell, played by Anne Lonnberg
 Tyroll, played by Hans Meyer
 Horst, played by Nick Brimble
 Conrad, played by John Otway
 Arris, played by Robert Addie
 Stefan, played by Conrad Phillips
 Weevil, played by Bernard Spiegel
 Ambrose, played by Bertie Cortez

Guest appearances

 Eleanor, played by Dana Barron
 The Emperor, played by Guy Rolfe
 Prince Ignatius, played by Johnny Crawford
 Gaston, played by Brian Blessed
 Princess, played by Valerie Steffen

 Captain of the Guard, played by Steve Buscemi
 François Arconciel, played by Roger Daltrey
 Sara Guidotti, played by Sarah Michelle Gellar
 Vogel " The Alchemist", played by David Warner
 Stefan, William Tell's mentor, played by Conrad Phillips (Philips had previously played the title role in The Adventures of William Tell)

Media
A television film, Crossbow: The Movie, edited from combined episodes of the series, was released on DVD in 2005, under the title The Adventures of William Tell. The complete series was later released in 2018 on six DVD discs.

An action-adventure game titled Crossbow: the Legend of William Tell, based on the series, was released in 1989 for the Amiga and the Atari ST.

Marvel Comics released several issues of a tie-in comic book, with the characters of Tell and Gessler drawn to the likenesses of Will Lyman and Jeremy Clyde. An illustrated storybook and a novelization were released as well.

The musical score for the series was composed by Stanisław Syrewicz, and used an arrangement of the William Tell Overture by Gioachino Rossini in one of the tracks. A limited printing of the score was released in 1989 on CD and on LP record.

Episodes

Season 1 (1987–88)

Season 2 (1988–89)

Season 3 (1989)

References

External links
 
 
 Crossbow – William Tell fansite

American action adventure television series
Cultural depictions of William Tell
1987 American television series debuts
1989 American television series endings
Television series set in the 14th century
Television shows set in Switzerland